The Bartini Stal-7 was a twin-engined transport aircraft designed and produced in the Soviet Union from 1934.

Development
Aeroflot issued a requirement for two transport aircraft types. Bartini began design work in October 1934 on an aircraft to meet the larger 10/12 passenger specification. Initially Bartini intended the Stal-7 to use a steel tube truss airframe, with fabric covering, but problems with complexity and the flexibility of the truss structure led Bartini to re-design the aircraft with a light-alloy monocoque structure. 

The hydraulically retractable main undercarriage legs retracted rearwards into the engine nacelles, which were positioned at the junction of the inverted gull wings. The trailing edges had hydraulically operated flaps inboard and ailerons outboard. Both the wings and tail surfaces were sharply tapered and the inboard wing sections sloped sharply upwards to pass through the fuselage cabin.

Flight testing began in the Spring of 1937 piloted by N. P. Shebanov, revealing high efficiency in speed, range and load. The Stal-7 crashed on take-off during full load testing, prompting the arrest of Bartini who was sent to a gulag in Siberia.

The impressive performance of the Stal-7 prompted the appointment of Yermolaev as the head of OKB-240, to develop the Stal-7 into an effective long-range bomber, resulting in the DB-240 (Dal'niy Bombardirovschik – long-range bomber), Yer-2 and Yer-4 aircraft.

Specifications (Stal-7)

See also

References

 Gunston, Bill. The Osprey Encyclopedia of Russian Aircraft 1875–1995. London, Osprey. 1995.

External links
 https://web.archive.org/web/20070703081400/http://www.aviation.ru/Bartini/

Inverted gull-wing aircraft
1930s Soviet airliners
Stal-007